Conrad Gargett is an Australian architecture and design practice delivering expertise globally. It was founded in Brisbane in 1890 and is one of Queensland's oldest architectural firms.

The practice operates out of studios in Brisbane, Sydney, Melbourne, Gold Coast, Townsville and Addis Ababa.

Establishment

Conrad Gargett Architecture was established as HW Atkinson in 1890 by Henry Wallace Atkinson with the winning design for the new Brisbane Head Fire Station. Charles McLay joined Atkinson to form the partnership HW Atkinson & Chas McLay in 1907. The practice subsequently assumed the position of Diocesan Architect to the Anglican Church, designing several schools and churches in South East Queensland. Following the death of McLay in 1918, the practice was renamed Atkinson & Conrad when Arnold Conrad became a partner. The new firm was noted for its use of the distinctive Spanish Mission style in many of its projects. The practice was also appointed to the position of Hospital Architect by various hospital boards and played a large role in the design of hospitals in Queensland between 1920–80, including extensive projects at the Royal Brisbane Hospital, South Brisbane Auxiliary Hospital (now Princess Alexandra Hospital), Prince Charles Hospital and Gold Coast Hospital. Following their appointment in 1926 as architects to the Brisbane and South Coast Hospital Board, the practice took on a new partner Lange Leopold Powell becoming Atkinson, Powell & Conrad.

During the post-war era, the firm now called AH Conrad & TBF Gargett (Thomas Brenan Femister Gargett having become a partner) became a prominent designer of commercial office towers in the Brisbane CBD. Most notable of these were the SGIO Building including the SGIO Theatre (now Suncorp Metway Plaza) and head offices for three of the big four banks. The MLC building, designed in 1955 with Bates Smart, was one of the first commercial office buildings to be built in the undecorated, modern style in Brisbane.

In 2017, a book titled Conrad Gargett was published detailing the history of the firm between 1890 and 2015. The book was edited by Robert Riddel, and attempts to provide a broader historical and architectural context to the various phases in which the practice has operated.

Growth
Conrad Gargett formed after Conrad Gargett Architecture undertook a series of mergers with Riddel Architecture (2012) and Ancher Mortlock Woolley (2013). The contemporary firm is a multi-disciplinary practice, which specialises in health, education, heritage and defence.

Riddel Architecture was established in 1982 by Robert Riddel. The Brisbane-based practice focused on heritage, conservation and adaptive reuse projects. Notable works by the firm include the restoration and adaptive re-use of Brisbane's Customs House, the former Wests Furniture Showroom and the former Queensland National Bank at 308 Queen Street (in association with Donovan Hill).

Ancher Mortlock Woolley, initially called Ancher Mortlock & Murray, was established in 1946 by Sydney Ancher, Bryce Mortlock and Stuart Murray. The Sydney-based practice was later joined by Ken Woolley in 1964. The practice designed modern structures, winning both the Sir Zelman Cowen Award for Public Architecture and the Robin Boyd Award for Residential Architecture. Notable projects by the practice include Town Hall House and Sydney Square (1977) and more recently, the Royal Agricultural Showground Exhibition Halls and restoration of the State Library of Victoria.

Current 
Conrad Gargett comprises over 200 inspired team members, each guided by the same values, social responsibility and unwavering commitment to elevating the practice's distinct design culture. 

The breadth and depth of their experience is evidenced in their rich portfolio, showcasing over 130 years of diverse projects varying in scale and complexity, and a global clientele spanning a variety of sectors (including Commercial, Community and Civic, Defence, Education and Research, Health, Heritage, Infrastructure, Justice, Residential, Retail and Hospitality, Seniors Living, Sport and Leisure, Transport, Urban Design and Masterplanning, and Workplace and Interior Design).

The specialist teams have a strong reputation of delivering on the practice's core purpose of creating meaningful places for people. To each project, the practice brings an unrivalled vision, innovative design and world leading expertise built upon the vibrant legacy of creating award-winning architecture and design for over a century.

Notable works

Conrad Gargett has designed some of Australia's landmark buildings predominately in Queensland, including the following major architectural projects:

See also

Architecture of Australia

References

External links
Conrad Gargett website
Digital Archive of Queensland Architecture
Fryer Library Database (Conrad Gargett Collection)
Book review: Conrad Gargett

Architecture firms of Australia
Companies based in Brisbane
Design companies established in 1890
1890 establishments in Australia